2014 W-League might refer to:

 2014 W-League (Australia)
 2014 USL W-League season